Hussein Dey is a suburb of the city of Algiers in northern Algeria, named after Hussein Dey, the last of the Ottoman provincial rulers of Algiers.

Notable people

 Mohamed Arkab (born 1966)

References

Suburbs of Algiers
Communes of Algiers Province